Starcalc is the second studio album by American electronic musician Vektroid, released on May 13, 2011.

Track listing
Bonus tracks

References

2011 albums
Vektroid albums